A Finnish Summer with Turisas is a documentary film by and about the Finnish metal band Turisas, featuring live performances.

It was released on 3 November 2008 in Europe and 25 November 2008 for the United States.

Track listing
Summer Festival Live Performances:
As Torches Rise
To Holmgard and Beyond
A Portage to the Unknown
The Messenger
One More
In the Court of Jarisleif
Fields of Gold
The Dnieper Rapids
The Land of Hope and Glory
Miklagard Overture
Sahti-Waari
Rasputin
Battle Metal
Extras:
70-minute tour documentary
Rasputin Music Video
Blooper Reel
Limited Edition Includes:
Warpaint colour card
"Battle Metal 2008" 3"CD

Recordings
Ruisrock 2008: "As Torches Rise", "In the Court of Jarisleif", "Rasputin"
Nummirock 2008: "To Holmgard and Beyond", "One More", "The Dneiper Rapids", "Miklagard Overture", "Battle Metal"
Ilosaarirock 2008: "A Portage to the Unknown", "Fields of Gold", "Sahti-Waari"
Wanaja 2008: "The Messenger"
Voimasointu 2008: "The Land of Hope and Glory"

References

External links 
 
 

Documentary films about heavy metal music and musicians
Finnish heavy metal musical groups